The 2014 Indy Eleven season was the club's inaugural season of existence. The club played in North American Soccer League, the second tier of the American soccer pyramid.

Background 

On January 16, 2013, NASL announced that an Indianapolis expansion team owned by Ersal Ozdemir, CEO of Keystone Group LLC, would join the league in 2014. Ozdemir named Peter Wilt as the team's first President and General Manager, this after the veteran American soccer executive had served in a consulting role to explore the viability of professional soccer in Indianapolis in the three months leading up to the January 2013 announcement.

Indy Pro Soccer's vision is to create a team that is representative of Indiana and creates strong emotional connections with its fans. Those connections will be made with Indiana's youth and adult soccer community and the active young adult urban and ethnic populations. The makeup of the team will reflect the community, so that it can live up to its slogan of "The World's Game, Indiana's Team". The club has secured over 6,000 season ticket deposits for its inaugural 2014 campaign as of October 2013.

The name and club colors were officially revealed to the public on April 25, 2013 during a ceremony held at Indianapolis' iconic Soldiers and Sailors Monument. Indy Eleven named former Indiana University standout, U.S. international and English Premier League and Major League Soccer veteran Juergen Sommer as its first Head Coach/Director of Soccer Operations on June 11, 2013.

On October 1, 2013 the team announced German goalkeeper, Kristian Nicht, as their first signing.

Roster

Friendlies

Competitions

NASL Spring season

Standings

Results summary

Results by round

Match reports

NASL Fall season

Standings

Results summary

Results by round

Match reports

U.S. Open Cup 

As a member of the NASL, the Eleven enter the Open Cup in the 3rd Round. Indy's win over Dayton was the team's first ever non-friendly match victory.

Match reports

Squad statistics

Appearances and goals

|-
|colspan="14"|Players who left Indy Eleven during the season:

|-
|}

Goal scorers

Disciplinary record

Transfers

In

Out

References 

Indy Eleven seasons
2014 NASL season by team
2014 in sports in Indiana